Heliophanus kilimanjaroensis is a jumping spider species in the genus Heliophanus.  It was first described by Wanda Wesołowska in 1986 and is found in Tanzania.

References

Endemic fauna of Tanzania
Spiders described in 1986
Fauna of Tanzania
Salticidae
Spiders of Africa
Taxa named by Wanda Wesołowska